The 1925–26 New York Americans season was the first season of the New York Americans ice hockey team of the National Hockey League. Despite having the roster of the previous season's top club, the Hamilton Tigers, the club finished in last place.

Offseason
Bill Dwyer became a hockey team owner by purchasing the suspended Hamilton Tigers franchise and the rights to its players for $80,000. Dwyer got Tommy Gorman to be general manager and coach from the Ottawa Senators, where he had been part-owner. Dwyer was convinced to buy the team by Bill MacBeth, an old friend and writer for the New York Herald-Tribune. MacBeth was convinced that the sport was a cinch to be successful in New York.

The negotiations with Percy Thompson for the Hamilton players started in July and broke off in September after it was found out that Mickey Roach had retired and Billy Burch was under contract to coach in Pittsburgh, Pennsylvania. Gorman purchased Joe Simpson, Crutchy Morrison and Roy Rickey for $10,000 from the Edmonton Eskimos. Edmonton offered to sell the remaining players of the Eskimos, including Duke Keats and George Hainsworth for $45,000, but Gorman's counter-offer of $25,000 was rejected. When it became clear that the NHL was going to take back the Hamilton franchise, Thompson settled with Gorman for $75,000 on September 26, at the NHL meetings in New York. Burch would eventually sign with the Americans for the then-huge salary of $25,000 for three seasons.

The players still had to pay their $200 fines before being allowed to play. Calder added the condition that each player had to write a letter of apology. Some of the first letters of apology were not acceptable to Calder and he demanded and got the players to rewrite the letters. $300 of each player's salary was held back until the end of the season to ensure they would play every game.

On December 4, eleven days before the first home game of the season, Dwyer would be arrested for bootlegging. Dwyer would slip into the background and Thomas Duggan of Montreal was named chairman of the board, John Hammond of the Madison Square Garden was named club president and the club was promoted as "Tex Rickard's Americans", Tex Rickard being the owner of Madison Square Gardens.

Pre-season
The Americans held their first-ever training camp at Niagara Falls, Ontario. Thomas Duggan spoke about worries of the "Americanization" of ice hockey, stating that he had been approached in prior years about forming a four-team American league, but had turned it down. He convinced the other promoters to join the NHL. Duggan stated that the Americans instead signed with the NHL for $15,000 for the franchise and $85,000 for the players.

Regular season
The former Hamilton players moved to New York and most moved into Bill Dwyer's headquarters, the Forrest Hotel, on 49th street, a half-block from the Gardens. The Hotel was also the home of several gangsters such as Legs Diamond, Dutch Schultz and Owney Madden, and writer Damon Runyon. and the liquor and lifestyle would interfere with the team's on-ice play. Players would miss games due to drunkenness, although publicly the missed games would be attributed to injury. The Americans, although having the roster of the previous season's top team, would finish in last place. The highlight of the season was a four-game winning streak in February, three of the four games played on the road.

Final standings

Record vs. opponents

Game log

Playoffs
The Americans did not qualify for the playoffs

Player stats

Regular season
Scoring

Goaltending

Awards and records

Transactions

See also
1925–26 NHL season

References

 
 

New York
New York
New York Americans seasons
New York Amer
New York Amer
1920s in Manhattan
Madison Square Garden